Rutherford County is the name of two counties in the United States:

 Rutherford County, North Carolina
 Rutherford County, Tennessee